Omsktransmash is a wholly state-owned engineering company based in the city of Omsk, Russia. The company was best known in the West during the Cold War period for its production of armoured vehicles such as the T-80 tank. The design bureau of the company, KBTM, was also responsible for the BTR-T, TOS-1 and 2S19 "Msta-S".

History
The beginnings of the organisation were in 1896 with the creation of a railway engineering workshop. The plant expanded in 1942 and gained its current importance when factories in Ukraine (Luhanskteplovoz) and Leningrad were evacuated to beyond the Ural mountains during the second world war. During that period the plant produced the T-34 tank.

Tractor production began in 1993.

In the post-Soviet Union period the state's decision to fund tank production at Uralvagonzavod in Nizhny Tagil (manufacturer of the T-90 tank) at the expense of the Omsk factory caused financial ruin for the company. The organisation had designed a new prototype tank, named Black Eagle but it did not enter production. Although the plant received work modernising T-62 and T-72 tanks this did not provide sufficient income and in 2002 the company went bankrupt.

In 2004 the design arm of the business was absorbed into Uralvagonzavod.

The military production at the plant was acquired by JSC KBTM (ОАО Конструкторское бюро транспортного машиностроения) in 2007

In 2008 bids were taken for the sale of the non-military part of the enterprise, the winner being ChTZ-Uraltrak (ЧТЗ-Уралтрак). However, the transaction was disallowed by the monopoly commission Federal Antimonopoly Service (FAS) due to complaints from Uraltrak's creditors Sberbank that they had not been paid.

In December 2009, JSC KBTM purchased the second part of Omsktransmash using funds provided by the Federal government.

On 12 September 2022, CEO of the Omsktransmash plant Vasily Kovalev announced that since the beginning of the Great Patriotic War for more than 80 years ago, the plant produced almost 30,000 various tanks starting with the famous T-34 model to the latest T-80BVM modification.

Products and facilities
As well as formerly manufacturing tanks and other military vehicles, the company also produces a variety of wheeled industrial vehicles in both two- and four-wheel drive based on a 'tractor' chassis:

Other products include "Омь-1,5" and "Омь-2,0" washing machines, gate valves for pipelines, jacks, conveyors and other general industrial machinery and tools.

See also
Kirov Plant Tank and machine building factory in St. Petersburg

Notes

References

External links
  , official website
 ,  former official website
Omsktransmash globalsecurity.org

Manufacturing companies of the Soviet Union
Defence companies of the Soviet Union
Companies based in Omsk
Uralvagonzavod